Ole Irgens is the name of:

Ole Irgens (bishop) (1724–1803), Norwegian bishop
Ole Irgens (politician) (1829–1906), Norwegian politician